The Little Unknown (Italian:La piccola ignota) is a 1923 Italian silent film directed by Guglielmo Zorzi and starring Carmen Boni.

Cast
 Carmen Boni
 Camillo Apolloni 
 Sandro D'Attino 
 Fabienne Fabrèges
 Yvonne Fleuriel

References

Bibliography
 Stewart, John. Italian film: a who's who. McFarland, 1994.

External links

1923 films
1920s Italian-language films
Films directed by Guglielmo Zorzi
Italian silent films
Italian black-and-white films